Thomas Couture (21 December 1815 – 30 March 1879) was a French history painter and teacher. He taught such later luminaries of the art world as Édouard Manet, Henri Fantin-Latour, John La Farge, Pierre Puvis de Chavannes, Karel Javůrek, and Joseph-Noël Sylvestre.

Life
Early life and education
Couture was born at Senlis, Oise, France.  When he was 11 his family moved to Paris, where he would study at the industrial arts school (École des Arts et Métiers) and later at the École des Beaux-Arts.

Art and teaching career
He failed the prestigious Prix de Rome competition at the École six times, but he felt the problem was with the École, not himself. Couture finally did win the prize in 1837.

In 1840 he began exhibiting historical and genre pictures at the Paris Salon, earning several medals for his works, in particular for his masterpiece, Romans During the Decadence (1847). Shortly after this success, Couture opened an independent atelier meant to challenge the École des Beaux-Arts by turning out the best new history painters.

Couture's innovative technique gained much attention, and he received Government and Church commissions for murals during the late 1840s through the 1850s. He never completed the first two commissions, and the third met with mixed criticism. Upset by the unfavorable reception of his murals, in 1860 he left Paris, for a time returning to his hometown of Senlis, where he continued to teach young artists who came to him. In 1867 he thumbed his nose at the academic establishment by publishing a book on his own ideas and working methods called Méthode et entretiens d'atelier (Method and Workshop Interviews). It was also translated to Conversations on Art Methods in 1879, the year he died.

Asked by a publisher to write an autobiography, Couture responded: "Biography is the exaltation of personality—and personality is the scourge of our time."

Death
In 1879 he died at Villiers-le-Bel, Val-d'Oise, and was interred in Père Lachaise Cemetery, Paris.

Selected paintings

Nazi-looted art in the Gurlitt collection 
Couture’s Portrait of a Seated Woman, (c.1850-1855), discovered in the Gurlitt trove, was identified as having belonged to Georges Mandel from a small hole in the canvas. It was restituted to Mandel's heirs in 2019.

References

Further reading

External links

 
 Article on Thomas Couture

19th-century French painters
French male painters
1815 births
1879 deaths
Burials at Père Lachaise Cemetery
Prix de Rome for painting
Academic art
19th-century painters of historical subjects
People from Senlis
19th-century French male artists